Lucky Duck is a Canadian animated television film produced by Nelvana. The special premiered on June 20, 2014, on Disney Junior. It is the first Disney Junior original movie.

Plot 

Lucky, a small rubber duck, prepares to leave the toy factory where he was born to be shipped to the store. A faulty whistle makes him immediately trashed. Eager to leave the factory he still manages to return to a box of toys ready to board the cargo ship. Lucky inadvertently is thrown off a cargo ship during a storm, and teams up with a pair of tub toy friends on an adventure to find the perfect home.

Voice cast 

 Christian Borle as Lucky
 Tom Cavanagh as Snap
 Megan Hilty as Flo
 Dan Chameroy as Captain Chase
 Gage Munroe as Danny Chase
 Milton Barnes as Shark Toy

Release 
The film premiered as scheduled on June 20, 2014, and the next day on Disney Channel.

Reception
Common Sense Media rated the film 4 out of 5 stars.

References

External links

Disney Junior television specials
Nelvana films
Disney Television Animation films
Films about sentient toys
English-language Canadian films
Canadian computer-animated films
Canadian animated television films